Hong Dong-hyun (born 30 October 1991) is a South Korean footballer who plays as a midfielder for Ansan Greeners in the K League 2.

Career
Hong signed with Busan IPark after graduating from Soongsil University. His first professional goal came directly from a free kick in a 2–1 defeat to Ulsan on 28 November 2015. In the following game, the first leg of a relegation play-off against Suwon City, Hong was sent off for two bookable offences. Busan went on to lose the tie and were relegated to the K League Challenge.

Club career statistics
As of 21 July 2017

References

External links 

1991 births
Living people
Association football midfielders
South Korean footballers
Busan IPark players
K League 1 players
K League 2 players
Ansan Greeners FC players